Half a Sinner is a 1934 American pre-Code drama film directed by Kurt Neumann and starring Sally Blane, Joel McCrea and Berton Churchill. It was based on the play Alias the Deacon, which was also the basis of 1927 and 1940 films.

Plot
A con man poses as a hillbilly preacher.

Main cast

References

Bibliography
 Dick, Bernard F. City of Dreams: The Making and Remaking of Universal Pictures. University Press of Kentucky, 2015.

External links
 

1934 films
1934 drama films
American drama films
Films directed by Kurt Neumann
American films based on plays
American black-and-white films
1930s English-language films
1930s American films